Bhilkati is a village in Phaltan tehsil of Satara district in Maharashtra state of India. The main activity of the community is farming. The village has a primary school up to the fifth standard. 

Cities and towns in Satara district